Lyfing (from leof, meaning "darling") is an Anglo-Saxon given name. Notable people bearing this name include:

 Lyfing, Archbishop of Canterbury (died 1020), advisor to King Ethelred the Unready
 Lyfing of Winchester (died 1047), advisor to King Canute the Dane